Tornaco is a comune (municipality) in the Province of Novara in the Italian region Piedmont, located about  northeast of Turin and about  southeast of Novara.

Tornaco borders the following municipalities: Borgolavezzaro, Cassolnovo, Cilavegna, Gravellona Lomellina, Terdobbiate, and Vespolate.

Demographic evolution

References

Cities and towns in Piedmont